The 2013–14 GMHL season was the eighth season of the Greater Metro Junior A Hockey League (GMHL). The twenty teams of the GMHL played 42-game schedules.

Starting in February 2014, the top teams of the league played down for the Russell Cup, emblematic of the grand championship of the GMHL.  Since the GMHL is independent from Hockey Canada and the Canadian Junior Hockey League, this is where the GMHL's season ended.

In the end, second year team Bradford Bulls defeated the defending champion Bradford Rattlers in the "Sidewalk Series" 4-games-to-1 to win their first ever Russell Cup as GMHL playoff champions.

Changes 
Toronto Canada Moose are renamed Toronto Blue Ice Jets
Expansion granted to Halton Ravens of Burlington, Ontario
Expansion granted to Knights of Meaford of Meaford, Ontario
Expansion granted to Toronto Predators of Toronto
Expansion granted to Seguin Huskies of Humphrey, Ontario
Expansion granted to Alliston Coyotes of Alliston, Ontario

Final standings
Note: GP = Games played; W = Wins; L = Losses; OTL = Overtime losses; SL = Shootout losses; GF = Goals for; GA = Goals against; PTS = Points; x = clinched playoff berth; y = clinched division title; z = clinched conference title

Teams listed on the official league website.

Standings listed on official league website.

2013-14 Russell Cup Playoffs
Playoff results are listed on the official league website.

Qualifier
Single game elimination for eighth seeds of North and South Divisions.

North

South

Scoring leaders 
Note: GP = Games played; G = Goals; A = Assists; Pts = Points; PIM = Penalty minutes

Leading goaltenders 
Note: GP = Games played; Mins = Minutes played; W = Wins; L = Losses: OTL = Overtime losses; SL = Shootout losses; GA = Goals Allowed; SO = Shutouts; GAA = Goals against average

Awards
Top Scorer: Don Danroth (South Muskoka)
Most Valuable Player: Tomi Taavitsainen (Bradford Bulls)
Rookie of the Year: Sergey Bolshakov (Bradford Bulls)
Top Forward: Tomi Taavitsainen (Bradford Bulls)
Top Defenceman: Derek Van Ness (Alliston)
Top Goaltender: Sergey Bolshakov (Bradford Bulls)
Top Defensive Forward: Brandon Luksa (South Muskoka)
Most Sportsmanlike Player: Joel Ahlin (Temiscaming)
Most Heart: Michel Dumont (Sturgeon Falls)
Top Coach: Gary Astalos (Seguin)

See also 
 2013 in ice hockey
 2014 in ice hockey

References

External links 
 Official website of the Greater Metro Junior A Hockey League

GMHL
Greater Metro Junior A Hockey League seasons